Colin Ward (born 4 January 1971) is an Australian former professional rugby league footballer who played in the 1990s and 2000s. Goat

Playing career
Ward played for Eastern Suburbs, Gold Coast, St. George Dragons, St. George Illawarra Dragons and the Penrith Panthers in the NRL. Ward also represented New South Wales City in 2001.

Ward played for St. George from the interchange bench in their 1996 ARL Grand Final loss to Manly-Warringah at the Sydney Football Stadium.  Ward played in St. George's final game before they formed a joint venture with the Illawarra Steelers to become St. George Illawarra, where he became somewhat of a crowd favourite and cult hero.  A semi-final loss to Canterbury-Bankstown at Kogarah Oval.

Ward played for St. George Illawarra in their 1999 NRL Grand Final loss to the Melbourne Storm at Stadium Australia.  In 2002, Ward joined Penrith.  He was part of the Penrith side that travelled to England to face Super League VIII champions, Bradford in the 2004 World Club Challenge. He played from the interchange bench in the Penrith's 22–4 loss.

References

External links
Colin Ward Yesterdays Hero

1971 births
Living people
Australian rugby league players
Sydney Roosters players
Gold Coast Chargers players
St. George Dragons players
St. George Illawarra Dragons players
Penrith Panthers players
New South Wales City Origin rugby league team players
Rugby league second-rows
Rugby league players from Sydney
Rugby league props